John Basil Charles Dickinson (25 April 1915 – 7 October 2013) was an Australian athlete who competed at the 1936 Summer Olympics in Berlin.

Born in Queanbeyan, Dickinson attended Sydney Boys High School, graduating in 1932. At the 1936 Summer Olympics he struggled with an injury; after finishing 16th in the triple jump he withdrew from the long jump.

Dickinson won the Australian title in the triple jump in 1934 and 1936–37. At the 1938 Empire Games he earned bronze medals in both the long jump and triple jump, and in 1939 he won the New South Wales decathlon title. This was his last athletics competition, as the same year he enlisted in the Second Australian Imperial Force. After World War II he worked in insurance and remained involved in athletics as an administrator. He was the chief judge of the jumping events at the 1956 Melbourne Olympics.

After the death of Bill Roycroft on 29 May 2011, Dickinson was recognised as Australia's oldest surviving Olympian, and as the last surviving member of the Australian 1936 Olympic team. He died on 7 October 2013, aged 98.

References

External links

 Basil Dickinson at Australian Athletics Historical Results
 Basil Dickinson – Australian Olympic Committee

1915 births
2013 deaths
Australian male triple jumpers
Australian male long jumpers
Olympic athletes of Australia
Athletes (track and field) at the 1936 Summer Olympics
Athletes (track and field) at the 1938 British Empire Games
Commonwealth Games bronze medallists for Australia
Commonwealth Games medallists in athletics
Australian Army personnel of World War II
People from Queanbeyan
Sportsmen from New South Wales
Medallists at the 1938 British Empire Games